The Israeli Judicial Selection Committee is the body that appoints judges to Israeli courts.

The committee was established in 1953, following the enactment of the Judges Bill. The founding of the committee was intended to prevent outside political pressure, and so ensure the independence of the judges.

Appointment of judges before the committee's establishment 

Until the enactment of the Judges Bill, the Justice Minister appointed the judges. Only the appointment of judges to the Supreme Court needed approval of the Cabinet and the Knesset.

When the State of Israel was established, the British judges appointed by the Mandate government left the country, but in most courts the Jewish judges remained, allowing the continued operation of the courts following the Declaration of Independence. In the Supreme Court only one Jewish judge, Gad Frumkin, was serving at the time.

Pinchas Rosen, the first Justice Minister decided not to continue Frumkin's tenure, and appointed five new justices, who were confirmed by the provisional government and provisional state council in July 1948. The five judges were appointed on a partisan basis: the court president Moshe Smoira and Yitzhak Olshan were identified with Mapai; Menachem Dunkelblum was associated with the General Zionists; Rabbi Simcha Assaf represented the religious faction; and Zalman Cheshin was mistakenly considered to be a revisionist, although in fact he belonged to the Haganah.

Judges Bill 
In 1952, the Knesset passed the Judges Bill, which stipulates methods of appointing judges (among other things). This bill proposed that the President will appoint the judges, at the suggestion of the Minister of Justice, in accordance with the recommendation by a committee of these ten members: the Justice Minister (committee chairman); another Cabinet minister; Chief justice and another judge of the Supreme Court; the Attorney General (who will be entitled to appoint in his place the Solicitor General); the Dean of the Faculty of Law in the Hebrew University; two Knesset members; and two members of the Law Council (now the Israel Bar Association).

Committee structure today 
According to Basic Law: the Judiciary, established in 1984, The committee has nine members, as follows:
 Justice Minister – Chairman
 Cabinet Minister, chosen by the Cabinet.
 Two Knesset Members, chosen by the Knesset (Since 1992 they usually appoint one member from the coalition and one from the opposition).
 Two members of the Bar Association (Usually selected by the two largest factions in the bureau).
 The Chief Justice, and two other judges of the Supreme Court (replaced every three years by the panel of judges, the selection is usually by seniority).

The committee's current members 

Representatives of the Supreme Court
 Justice Esther Hayut – Chief Justice. Member since 2017.
 Judge Yitzhak Amit – Supreme Court Justice. Member since 2021.
 Judge Uzi Vogelman– Supreme Court Justice. Member since 2020.

Bar Association representatives
 Attorney Eilana Saker – Member since 2015.
 Attorney Mohammad Neamana – Head of Northern District in the Bar Association. Member since 2011.

Israeli government officials
 Yariv Levin – Justice Minister.
 Miri Regev

Knesset representatives
 MK Zvi Hauser
 MK Osnat Mark

Judicial selection process 
The process of electing the judges is regulated by the Rules of procedure of the Judicial Selection Committee, 1984.

This process includes:
 Application for election by the applicant. Includes filled questionnaire; resume; recommendations; etc.
 Verification of recommendations by the court's administration.
 Publishing the candidate list in Reshumot, followed by a waiting period of at least 21 days in which every citizen may contact the committee before the hearing, with a reasoned explanation of opposition to a particular candidate.
 Interview of the candidate by a subcommittee of the Judicial Selection Committee, containing at least three members (at least one judge, one attorney, and one MK).
 Final decision by the Committee to confirm or reject a candidate.

The Committee's decision to appoint a judge in all courts (except the Supreme Court), is passed by a simple majority of members present at the meeting. Appointing Supreme Court judges requires a majority of 7 of the 9 committee members, or two less than the number present at the meeting (6 of 8, 5 of 7, etc.).

Confidentiality applies legally to the committee's deliberations and they are not published for public review. This confidential appointment process is unique, because the selection process for every other public office is required by law to register and publish minutes of the committee's meetings.

Controversy of the committee's composition 
During the existence of the Judicial Committee the influence of the Supreme Court committee members was almost absolute: although they constitute only a third of the committee, they are the only cohesive and stable group, while the other members change frequently. Because a nomination requires a majority of 7 out of the 9 members, a cohesive group of three Supreme Court committee members can effectively veto any nomination with which they disagree.

Until the 1990s, the judges dominated the Committee through an alliance forged with representatives of the Bar Association.

This system – dubbed by some as the "friend brings a friend" cycle – has been criticized by jurists and politicians, mainly aligned with the political right in Israel, who argued that the selection process does not properly represent public opinion, and that since the Supreme Court inevitably discusses politically disputed matters, the process impairs the principles of democracy. Some pushed for change in the process but were opposed by the fear that a change will eventually lead to politicization of the Judicial Selection, based on political views and affiliations rather than professional and moral skills.

One of the suggestions, by Mordechai Heller, was to go through the appointments system reminiscent of the federal courts in the United States, and to some extent the method that was used in Israel before 1953: authorizing the Prime Minister to propose candidates, and appoint them by Knesset authority, after a public hearing process (this was suggested at the time when there were direct prime minister elections in Israel, according to which Heller viewed the prime minister's office and the Knesset as two independent authorities, a distinction that is now obsolete since the prime minister is no longer elected directly). He even raised the possibility of adding a professional committee to ensure that candidates meet the appropriate qualification level.

Prior to his appointment as Justice Minister, Professor Daniel Friedmann wrote that it's crucial to change something in the composition of the committee. He proposed that instead of selecting all three judges to the committee from the Supreme Court, two shall be district court judges or retired district court judges. Some of the benefits would be dispersed authority (preventing a powerful positioning of a relatively small group of Supreme Court justices in driving the whole judicial system); more objective approach to candidates; and that the district judges will be better acquainted with the candidates for lower courts whom they have to appoint.

In contrast, the Israeli Democracy Institute supports leaving the status quo intact, and includes the existing system in its proposed Constitution without any changes. The Head of the Bar Association, Yuri Guy-Ron, also supports keeping the existing pattern. (Retired) Chief Justice, Aharon Barak strongly condemned the proposed changes in selecting judges. He argued that although the Israeli system is not free of problems, it still tops all the suggestions to improve it, and that on this matter it's better that other countries learn from Israel and not the opposite.

Several Knesset members tried at different times to change the legislation the committee structure, including David Tal and Michael Eitan, at the time chairman of the Knesset Constitution, Law and Justice committee, but their proposals didn't gather enough support.

Daniel Friedmann was appointed Justice Minister in February 2007. Critical of the judicial system before, and an outspoken opponent of the Supreme Court and the committee's selection process, he was appointed by, then Prime Minister, Ehud Olmert to shake up the judicial system. His opponents criticized his appointment as a political maneuver to influence the judicial system, specifically the case against Olmert's close friend and important ally, and Friedmann's predecessor as Justice Minister, Haim Ramon. Friedmann criticized the court's handling of the Ramon affair in an article just days prior to his appointment; he later also criticized the guilty verdict on Ramon.

Friedmann proposed some fundamental changes to the committee, including the number of members and the way they are selected. He had some highly publicized encounters with Chief Justice Dorit Beinish and her predecessor Aharon Barak over his reform proposals and other related matters. Barak even said about some of Friedmann's proposals that they are like "holding a gun to the head of the Supreme Court". In the end, he succeeded in implementing some of his proposed changes, but the system's critics still charged that it wasn't nearly enough.

In June 2009, with the selection to the committee of the two right-wing MK's, Uri Ariel (National Union), and David Rotem (Yisrael Beiteinu), a conflict erupted between the various factions of the Knesset members. The first committee meeting brought about a fundamental change in the appointing process when it was ruled that candidates will need to undergo tests and a course adjustment, and will be evaluated by a psychologist to examine their mental suitability – against the fierce opposition of Chief Justice Dorit Beinish.

Comparison

According to a 2019 study by the Kohelet Policy Forum, of the 37 OECD member states, 31 countries grant control over the selection of the members of the highest constitutional court to elected public officials. Of those: In 10 countries, members of the court are selected in collaboration between the executive and the legislative branches; in six countries, the legislative branch alone selects its members; in 10 countries, they are
selected solely by the executive branch; and in five additional countries, a split model is used where elected public of ficials control the identity of most of the serving judges but not all of them. Thus, for example, in the United States, the president of the United States selects the justices of the Supreme Court with the approval of the Senate. In France, members of the
Constitutional Council are selected by the president and both chambers of parliament. In Australia, the attorney general selects the members of the Supreme Court. In Japan, they are selected by the Japanese government with the approval of the entire country through a public referendum. Diverging slightly from the above pattern, in Italy, elected public of ficials are responsible for selecting 10 out of the 15 members of the Constitutional Court (while the rest are
selected by the legal system).

Only Israel and five other countries place the power to determine the identity of all or most of the members of the constitutional court in the hands of entities who are not elected public officials. The other five countries are the United Kingdom, Luxembourg, Turkey, Greece, and Colombia.
However, of the above five, in the United Kingdom and Luxembourg, the court does not have the power to overturn legislation and therefore, the public — through its elected representatives — continues to control the determination of policy

An examination of the states that comprise the United States indicates an even clearer tendency than above, as in all of them, the process of selecting the members of the highest constitutional court is given to elected public officials in one way or another. Direct elections at the ballot box
is the most common method among those states and is the practice in 22 of them. In four states, elected public of ficials are the ones who select the judges, without the involvement of a professional commission. In 24 states, a professional commission is involved in the appointment process and submits a short list of candidates to elected public of ficials who select from it the candidate to be appointed. Moreover, in 16 of those states, the elected public officials determine the identity of the majority of the commission members. In addition, out of those 16 states, in one, the appointment undergoes a retention process before the legislative houses at the end of each term, and in eight, direct retention elections by the public at large are held usually up to two years from the date of appointment. Finally, in eight states, the state governor selects the judges with the involvement of a professional committee (the majority of whose members are not appointed by elected public officials). However, in all of those states, the judges stand for direct, general retention elections by the public at large usually very close to the date of appointment as well as for recurring retention elections at the end of each term (usually, every 6 to 12 years). That is to say, in all of the individual states of the Unites States, the process of selecting judges to the highest constitutional court is placed in the hands of the public, whether by direct elections or by means of its democratically elected representatives, either in an election procedure or through a process of ratification thereof (retention). Even in states in which there is binding involvement of professional entities, the judges face general retention elections close to the date of their appointment
in order to ensure democratic legitimatization of their service. In total, the public is involved in directly selecting judges in 38 of the states through a democratic election at the ballot box, and in the rest, the public influences the selection process through its representatives.

See also 
 Supreme Court of Israel

References 

Judiciary of Israel
Law of Israel
Israeli courts
Judicial nominations and appointments